The Secret Garden Party, often colloquially shortened to the SGP, is an independent arts and music festival which takes place in Abbots Ripton near Huntingdon in England. This location is on part of the grounds of a Georgian farmhouse and has its own lakes, river and landscaped gardens.  The festival was launched by Fred Fellowes  and James Whewell in 2004 as an alternative to the established mainstream music festivals.  Since its inception the festival has increased in popularity and size, and has grown from one stage and 300 visitors in 2002, to more than 15 stages and 35,000 revellers in 2017. 

In March 2017, it was announced that the 2017 edition would be the last.

Over its initial 15 year run, The Secret Garden Party won the UK Festival Award for Best Small-Sized Festival in 2005 and 2008, and then Award for Best Medium-Sized Festival in 2011. It also won the Act of Independence award from the Association of Independent Festivals (AIF) for its work with The LOOP that tests drugs on site during the event, a practice which has now been adopted by other UK festivals.

In August 2021, it was announced that after a five-year hiatus, the Secret Garden Party would return in summer 2022. On relaunching, 20,000 tickets were placed on sale which sold out in under 20 minutes via a registration process that featured a questionnaire. The event will take place from 21st to 24th July 2022 in Cambridgeshire, with a line-up to be announced each day of the festival. 

The Secret Garden Party supports The Campaign Against Living Miserably (CALM), which aims to prevent male suicide in the United Kingdom,  as well as mental health charity My Black Dog as of 2022.

Lineups

2004

 KT Tunstall
 The Egg
 The Basics
 Tallula
 Carina Round

2005
 Super Furry Animals
 Desmond Dekker
 Mando Diao
 Regina Spektor
 Adam Freeland
 The Noisettes
 Boy Kill Boy

2006
 Lily Allen
 Indigo Moss
 OK GO
 The Hair
 Arlo Guthrie

2007
26–29 July
 Echo & The Bunnymen
 Indigo Moss
 The Noisettes
 The Sunshine Underground
 New Young Pony Club
 Alabama 3

2008
24–27 July
 Grace Jones
 Morcheeba
 Alphabeat
 Shout Out Louds
 Florence & The Machine
 Metronomy
 My Pretend Orchestra
 Eugene Francis Jnr
 Noah and the Whale
 Mumford and Sons

2009
23–26 July
 Jarvis Cocker
 Emiliana Torrini
 The XX
 Adam Freeland
 EMF
 Emmy the Great

2010
22–25 July
 Gorillaz
 Marina and the Diamonds
 Echaskech
 Hybrid
 Cloud Control
 Eliza Doolittle
 Animal Kingdom
 Mystery Jets
 Infadels
 Crystal Fighters

2011
21–24 July
 Blondie
 Leftfield
 Cosmo Jarvis
 Adam Freeland
 Matt and Kim
 Martha Reeves and the Vandellas
 Mystery Jets
 I am Kloot

2012
19–22 July

 Orbital 
 Edward Sharpe & the Magnetic Zeros
 KT Tunstall
 Little Roy
 Caravan Palace
 Little Dragon
 Alabama Shakes
 Tim Minchin
 Lamb
 Lianne La Havas
 The Ladykillers
 Bastille

2013
25–28 July

 Faithless
 Regina Spektor
 2ManyDJs
 Django Django
 David Icke
 The Ladykillers
 SYKUR
 Bastille
 Phildel

Attendance: 29,000

2014
24–27 July

 Little Dragon
 Sub Focus
 My Nu Leng
 Clean Bandit
 MØ
 Gorgon City
 Morcheeba
 Sigma
 Matrix and Futurebound
 The Skints
 Years and Years
 Fat Freddy's Drop

2015
23-26 July

 Kae Tempest
 Caravan Palace
 Jungle

2016
21-24 July

 Caribou
 Dua Lipa
 Air
 The Temper Trap
 Field Music

Primal Scream were due to appear but cancelled shortly before the festival.

2017
20-23 July

 Crystal Fighters
 Metronomy
 Toots and the Maytals
 Peaches

Related events
The 2009 Secret Garden Party Valentines Bacchanalia Ball, named after annual parties held in honour of the Greek god Dionysus, took place on 28 February at the Dex Club in Brixton, London.

Secret Garden Party's co-organizers, Secret Productions teamed up with Thai production company Scratch First to produce the inaugural Wonderfruit - a sustainable lifestyle festival in Thailand.

External links
Secret Garden Party Official Website
eFestivals festival coverage

Notes

Music festivals in Cambridgeshire
Annual events in the United Kingdom
2004 establishments in England
Music festivals established in 2004